Qingdao Jiaozhou Bay Bridge is a  long roadway bridge in Qingdao, Shandong province, China, which is part of the  Jiaozhou Bay Connection Project.

Description 
The design of the bridge is T-shaped with the main entry and exit points in Huangdao District and Licang District, Qingdao. A branch to Hongdao Subdistrict is connected by a semi-directional T interchange to the main span. The bridge is designed to be able to withstand severe earthquakes, typhoons, and collisions from ships. It is supported by 5,238 concrete piles.

The Jiaozhou Bay Bridge has three navigable sections: the Cangkou Channel Bridge to the west, the Dagu Channel Bridge to the east, and the Hongdao Channel Bridge to the north.

Length

The Jiaozhou Bay Bridge is part of the Jiaozhou Bay Connection Project, which includes overland expressways and the Qingdao Jiaozhou Bay tunnel.

The Jiaozhou Bay Connection Project consists of two non-connected sections: a -long expressway that includes the Jiaozhou Bay Bridge and a -long expressway that includes the Qingdao Jiaozhou Bay Tunnel.

The  section is further broken into multiple parts:
 - Jiaozhou Bay Bridge of which 25.9 km (16.1 mi) is over water in the aggregate of three legs.
 - Licang District side land bridge
 - Huangdao District side land bridge
 - Hongdao Subdistrict connection

Records 
The Guinness title was taken by the Hong Kong-Zhuhai-Macau Bridge in October 2018.

The bridge builder Shandong Gaosu Group claimed that Jiaozhou Bay Bridge had the first oversea interchange in the world and that it has the world's largest number of oversea bored concrete piles.

History 
The bridge was the idea of a local official in the Chinese Communist Party who was subsequently dismissed for corruption. It was designed by the Shandong Gaosu Group. It took four years to build, and employed at least 10,000 people. It opened on 30 June 2011 for traffic.

The Qingdao Jiaozhou Bay tunnel opened on the same day as the bridge.

Concerns regarding the bridge's safety were raised when Chinese media reported that the bridge was opened with faulty elements, such as incomplete crash-barriers, missing lighting, and loose nuts on guard-rails, with workers stating that it would take two months before finishing all of the projects related to the bridge. Shao Xinpeng, the bridge's chief engineer, claimed that in spite of the safety report, the bridge was safe and ready for traffic, adding that the problems highlighted in the reports were not major.

The bridge was reported by the official state-run television company CCTV to cost CN¥10 billion (GB£900 million). Other sources reported costs as high as CN¥55 billion (US$8.8 billion, GB£5.5 billion).

See also

Qingdao Jiaozhou Bay tunnel
Donghai Bridge
Hangzhou Bay Bridge
Lupu Bridge
Lake Pontchartrain Causeway

References

Bridges in Shandong
Road bridges in China
Cable-stayed bridges in China
Bridges completed in 2011
Toll bridges in China
2011 establishments in China
Cross-sea bridges in China